The 1992 Big Sky Conference men's basketball tournament was the seventeenth edition, held  at Dahlberg Arena at the University of Montana in Missoula, Montana.

Top-seeded Montana repeated as conference champions by defeating  in the championship game,  to win their second Big Sky tournament title. Both of Montana's opponents in the tournament had defeated them earlier in 

It was Nevada's thirteenth and final year in the Big Sky; they departed for the Big West in the summer.

Format
Total conference membership remained at nine and the tournament format was unchanged.

The top six teams from the regular season were included and the regular season champion earned the right to host. The top two earned byes into the semifinals while the remaining four played in the quarterfinals; the top seed (host) met the lowest remaining seed in the semifinals.

Bracket

NCAA tournament
The Grizzlies  received an automatic bid to the NCAA tournament, and no other Big Sky members were invited to the tournament  Montana received three votes in the final AP poll, and was seeded fourteenth in the West regional; they lost by ten points in the first round to Florida State  It was the tenth consecutive year in which the Big Sky representative lost in the first round.

See also
Big Sky Conference women's basketball tournament

References

Big Sky Conference men's basketball tournament
Tournament
Big Sky Conference men's basketball tournament
Big Sky Conference men's basketball tournament
Basketball competitions in Missoula, Montana
College sports tournaments in Montana